Mora v. McNamara, 389 U.S. 934 (1967), is a case in which the United States Supreme Court was asked to rule on the case of a conscientious objector (a member of the Fort Hood Three) who claimed that the U.S. war against Vietnam was an illegal war of aggression. In this case, the court cited only the Kellogg-Briand Pact, Article 39 of the United Nations Charter and the Treaty of London (which established the Nuremberg War Crimes Tribunal) as the relevant body of international law regarding cases of war.

Certiorari was denied over the dissents of Justices Stewart and Douglas.

See also
 List of United States Supreme Court cases, volume 389
 Gunn v. University Committee to End the War in Viet Nam
 Lloyd Corp. v. Tanner

External links
 
 

United States Supreme Court cases
United States Supreme Court cases of the Warren Court
United States foreign relations case law
1967 in United States case law
Bell County, Texas
Opposition to United States involvement in the Vietnam War
Aggression in international law